Grant House may refer to:

Places in the United States
Grant House may refer to a number of places in the United States (listed by state, then by city):

Colorado
Grant-Humphreys Mansion, Denver, Colorado, listed on the U.S. National Register of Historic Places (NRHP) and a Denver Landmark
Grant House (Denver, Colorado), 100 S. Franklin Street, a Denver Landmark

Connecticut
Ebenezer Grant House, East Windsor Hill, Connecticut, NRHP-listed

Iowa
Douglas and Charlotte Grant House, Marion, Iowa, NRHP-listed

Kansas
George Grant Villa, Victoria, Kansas, listed on the NRHP in Ellis County, Kansas

Kentucky
Stone-Grant House, Georgetown, Kentucky, listed on the NRHP in Scott County, Kentucky
George W. Grant House, Lexington, Kentucky, listed on the NRHP in Fayette County, Kentucky
Lindenberger-Grant House, Lyndon, Kentucky, listed on the NRHP in Jefferson County, Kentucky

Louisiana
Grant-Black House, New Orleans, Louisiana, listed on the NRHP in Orleans Parish, Louisiana

Maine
Peter Grant House, Farmingdale, Maine, listed on the NRHP in Kennebec County, Maine
William F. Grant House, North Vassalboro, Maine, listed on the NRHP in Kennebec County, Maine
Grant Family House, Saco, Maine, listed on the NRHP in York County, Maine

Massachusetts
Benjamin Grant House, Ipswich, Massachusetts, NRHP-listed

Minnesota
Grant House (Rush City, Minnesota), Rush City, Minnesota, listed on the NRHP in Chisago County, Minnesota

Montana
Grant-Kohrs Ranch/Warren Ranch, Deer Lodge, Montana, listed on the NRHP in Powell County, Montana
Grant-Kohrs Ranch National Historic Site, Deer Lodge, Montana, NRHP-listed

New York
Grant Cottage, Mount McGregor, New York, where Ulysses S. Grant died

Ohio
Ulysses S. Grant Boyhood Home, Georgetown, Ohio, NRHP-listed
A.G. Grant Homestead, Grove City, Ohio, NRHP-listed
William H. Grant House (Middleport, Ohio), NRHP-listed

Oregon
Henry M. Grant House, Portland, Oregon, NRHP-listed

Pennsylvania
O.B. Grant House, Ridgway Township, Pennsylvania, NRHP-listed

Tennessee
Grant-Lee Hall, Harrogate, Tennessee, listed on the NRHP in Claiborne County, Tennessee

Virginia
William H. Grant House (Richmond, Virginia), NRHP-listed

Wisconsin
Paul S. Grant House, Whitefish Bay, Wisconsin, listed on the NRHP in Milwaukee County, Wisconsin

Wyoming
Robert Grant Ranch, Wheatland, Wyoming, listed on the NRHP in Platte County, Wyoming

People
Grant House (swimmer), an American swimmer and gold medalist at the 2015 FINA World Junior Swimming Championships

See also
William H. Grant House (disambiguation)